In the first edition of the tournament, Leonardo Lavalle and Jaime Oncins won the title by defeating Horacio de la Peña and Jorge Lozano 7–6, 6–4 in the final.

Seeds

Draw

Draw

References

External links
 Official results archive (ATP)
 Official results archive (ITF)

Abierto Mexicano - Doubles